This page provides the summary of RBBC1 Latin America Region Qualifier/Finals. 

Since 2011, Red Bull BC One has held a qualifier for the World Final in the Latin America Region. The winner advances to the Red Bull BC One World Final.

Winners

2015

RBBC1 Latin American 2015 results 
Location: Lima, Peru

2014

RBBC1 Latin American 2014 results 
Location: Belem, Brazil

2013

RBBC1 Latin American 2013 results 
Location: Bogota, Colombia

2012

RBBC1 Latin American 2012 results 
Location: Monterrey, Mexico

2011

RBBC1 Latin American 2011 results 
Location: Salvador, Brazil

Red Bull BC One